Tol-e Khandaq-e Olya (also Romanized as Tol-e Khandaq-e ‘Olyā; also known as Tol-e Jandaq and Tol-e Khandaq) is a village in Bakesh-e Yek Rural District, in the Central District of Mamasani County, Fars Province, Iran. At the 2006 census, its population was 173, in 38 families.

References 

Populated places in Mamasani County